Xiaohu Yu from the Southeast University, Nanjing, Jiangsu, China was named Fellow of the Institute of Electrical and Electronics Engineers (IEEE) in 2012 for leadership in the development of mobile communications in China.

References

Fellow Members of the IEEE
Living people
Year of birth missing (living people)
Place of birth missing (living people)
Academic staff of Southeast University